Miracle of Marcelino ("Marcelino, bread and wine") is a 1955 Spanish film written by José Maria Sanchez-Silva, based on his novel, and directed by Ladislao Vajda. It starred, Juan Calvo (who also starred together as Don Quixote and Sancho Panza in the 1947 Spanish film version of Miguel de Cervantes' Don Quixote) and the young child star Pablito Calvo (no relation to Juan) as Marcelino. The musical score and theme song – sung in full during the action, rather than at the start of the film – are by Pablo Sorozábal.

The story, revised and modernised in both the book and film, dates back to a medieval legend, one of many gathered together in a volume by Alfonso el Sabio. It was a critical and commercial success, and other countries have produced versions of it.

Plot
The story revolves around Marcelino, an orphan abandoned as a baby on the steps of a monastery in nineteenth-century Spain. The monks raise the child, and Marcelino grows into a rowdy young boy. He has been warned by the monks not to visit the monastery attic, where a "very big man who will take him away" lives, but he ventures upstairs anyway, sees the man and tears off back down the stairs.

At a festival, Marcelino causes havoc when he accidentally topples a pile of fruit and lets some animals loose.  The new local mayor, a blacksmith whom the monks would not let adopt Marcelino because of his coarse behaviour, uses the incident as an excuse to try to shut down the monastery.

Given the silent treatment by the monks, Marcelino gathers up the courage to once again enter the attic, where he sees not a bogeyman, but a beautiful statue of Christ on the Cross. Remarking that the statue looks hungry, Marcelino steals some bread and wine and offers it to the statue, which comes to life, descends from the Cross, and eats and drinks what the boy has brought him. The statue becomes Marcelino's best friend and confidant and begins to give him religious instruction. For his part, Marcelino realizes that the statue is Christ.

The monks know something is strange when they notice bread and wine disappearing, and arrange to spy on Marcelino. One day, the statue notices that Marcelino is pensive and brooding instead of happy, and tells him that he would like to reward his kindness. Marcelino answers: "I want only to see my mother, and to see Yours after that". The statue cradles Marcelino in its arms, tells Marcelino to sleep - and Marcelino dies happy.

The monks witness the miracle through a crack in the attic door and burst in just in time to see the dead Marcelino bathed in a heavenly glow. The statue returns to its place on the Cross, and Marcelino is buried underneath the chapel and venerated by all who visit the now flourishing monastery-turned-shrine.

The main story is told in flashback by a monk (played by Fernando Rey), who, visiting a dying girl, tells her the story of Marcelino for inspiration. The film ends with the monk entering the now completely remodelled chapel in the monastery during Mass, and saying to the crucifix once kept in the attic: "We have been speaking about You, O Lord", and then, to Marcelino's grave, which is situated nearby, "And about you, too, Marcelino."

Cast

Legacy 
The film remains one of the most famous and successful Spanish films ever made in history, and one of the first Spanish films to become successful in the U.S. as well.

Three key scenes of the film were filmed in La Alberca (Salamanca). Its Plaza Mayor serves as a stage for the initial scene, in which the narrator friar, Fernando Rey, goes down to the village to tell the sick child the story of Marcellino. The scene of the market, where Marcelino has just climbed into a cockpit after causing the stampede of a yoke of oxen. Finally, back to the convent, they pass in front of the Hermitage of San Blas of said locality. All the atmosphere related to the convent is located in the chapel of the Cristo del Caloco in El Espinar (Segovia) one which has great devotion in the region;

The figure of the Christ, however, does not correspond to that of the Caloco, but is a sculpture of the sculptor Antonio Simont and is currently on the altar of the Chapel of St. Teresa of the Convent of the Carmelites of Don Benito (Badajoz). There it ended up at the wish of one of the sound engineers of the film, Miguel López Cabrera, whose sister was a nun in the convent.

Remakes
A Philippine remake of Miracle of Marcelino, under its original title, was released in 1979.
An Italian remake, Marcellino, was produced in 1991 in color, and was much less successful than the original film.
In 2000, VIP Toons of Spain, PMMP and TF1 of France and Nippon Animation of Japan created the first TV series adaptation of the story, also titled Marcelino Pan y Vino after the original novel.  The first 26-episode run (2000-2001) was adapted into several languages, including French, Spanish, Tagalog, Portuguese, and Italian, and became a success across Europe. An additional 26 episodes were made in 2004 and aired in Germany in 2006.
 The film became the inspiration for the 2009–2010 ABS-CBN teleserye, May Bukas Pa. 
A Mexican remake was released on 16 December 2010, with the basic storyline and framed by the Mexican Revolution of 1910.
 The 2023 Brazilian telenovela Amor Perfeito is also based on Marcelino, pan y vino.

Awards
Won
 1955 Cannes Film Festival
 OCIC Award - Special Mention
 Pablito Calvo - Special Mention
 5th Berlin International Film Festival: Silver Bear

Nominated
 1955 Cannes Film Festival: Palme d'Or

References

External links

1955 films
1950s Spanish-language films
Films about Catholicism
Films about Christianity
Spanish black-and-white films
Spain in fiction
Films directed by Ladislao Vajda
Spanish children's films
Spanish comedy-drama films
1955 comedy-drama films